Ophonus jeanneli is a species of ground beetle in the subfamily Harpalinae, genus Ophonus, and subgenus Ophonus (Metophonus).

References

jeanneli
Beetles described in 1987